Noel Peyton (born Dublin, Ireland; 4 December 1935) is an Irish former professional footballer who played as an inside left for Shamrock Rovers, Leeds United and York City, and for the Republic of Ireland national football team.

Club career
An inside left, Peyton made a scoring debut for Shamrock Rovers in October 1953 in a 4–2 win in the League of Ireland Shield. He made two appearances in European competition while at Shamrock Rovers, and in January 1958, moved to Leeds United for a £5,000 fee. Peyton spent five seasons at Leeds, a period when the club was relegated to the Second Division at the end of the 1959–60 season and fought a battle against relegation to the Third Division during the 1961–62 season. He scored 20 goals in 117 appearances for Leeds before joining York City for £4,000 in July 1963, where he made 37 appearances, scoring four goals, during the 1963–64 season. His brother Willie Peyton was also a footballer who played for St Patrick's Athletic F.C. Willie scored the winner in both FAI cup finals for St. Pats, the first in 1959, 2-1 against Waterford United in Dalymount Park (a replay) and again in 1961, 2-1 against Drumcondra, also in Dalymount Park.

International career
Peyton played six times for the Republic of Ireland national football team, once while at Shamrock Rovers. He also won a Republic of Ireland B cap against Romania in 1957 and played 6 times for the League of Ireland XI.

Honours
League of Ireland: 2
  Shamrock Rovers - 1953/54, 1956/57
FAI Cup: 2
  Shamrock Rovers - 1955, 1956
League of Ireland Shield: 3
  Shamrock Rovers - 1954/55, 1955/56, 1956/57
Leinster Senior Cup: 2
  Shamrock Rovers - 1956, 1957
Dublin City Cup: 1
  Shamrock Rovers - 1956/57

References

Association footballers from County Dublin
Republic of Ireland association footballers
Republic of Ireland international footballers
Republic of Ireland B international footballers
Shamrock Rovers F.C. players
League of Ireland players
Leeds United F.C. players
York City F.C. players
1935 births
Living people
Barnstaple Town F.C. players
League of Ireland XI players
Association football forwards